James Matthew was a 19th-century Scottish footballer who appeared in the Football League for Burnley and Accrington.

References

Footballers from Dundee
Scottish footballers
Association football central defenders
Lincoln City F.C. players
Burnley F.C. players
Accrington F.C. players
Millwall F.C. players
Year of death missing
English Football League players
Year of birth missing